Hypselistes is a genus of dwarf spiders that was first described by Eugène Louis Simon in 1894.

Species
 it contains nine species and one subspecies, found in Canada, China, Japan, Kazakhstan, Mongolia, Russia, and the United States:
Hypselistes acutidens Gao, Sha & Zhu, 1989 – China
Hypselistes asiaticus Bösenberg & Strand, 1906 – Japan
Hypselistes australis Saito & Ono, 2001 – Russia (Far East), Japan
Hypselistes basarukini Marusik & Leech, 1993 – Russia (Sakhalin)
Hypselistes florens (O. Pickard-Cambridge, 1875) (type) – USA, Canada
Hypselistes f. bulbiceps Chamberlin & Ivie, 1935 – USA
Hypselistes fossilobus Fei & Zhu, 1993 – Russia (Far East), China
Hypselistes jacksoni (O. Pickard-Cambridge, 1903) – Europe, Russia (Europe to Far East), Kazakhstan, Mongolia, China
Hypselistes kolymensis Marusik & Leech, 1993 – Russia (Middle Siberia to Far North-East)
Hypselistes semiflavus (L. Koch, 1879) – Russia (Europe to Far East), Japan

See also
 List of Linyphiidae species (A–H)

References

Araneomorphae genera
Linyphiidae
Spiders of Asia
Spiders of North America